Dr. Marie Zdeňka Baborová-Čiháková (17 January 1877, Prague - 29 September 1937, Čelákovice) was the first female Czech botanist and zoologist.

Works

See also
Timeline of women in science

References

1877 births
1937 deaths
Czech women scientists
Czech botanists
Czech zoologists
Women botanists
Zoologists from the Austro-Hungarian Empire